Temple Israel is a Reform synagogue located in Kinston, North Carolina. Established by Eastern European Jews in 1903, it is one of the oldest synagogues in North Carolina. Having started and functioning as an Orthodox congregation during its first fifty years, it eventually transformed into a Reform congregation.

History

Established in 1903, Tifereth Israel was the first congregation in Kinston, North Carolina. Originally Orthodox, the synagogue hired Rabbi Isaac Goodkovitz, who served until 1916. As more European Jews emigrated to the small, eastern North Carolina town, the congregation grew as well. By the mid-1920s more than 140 Jewish families lived in Kinston, a town with a population of only 8,000.

In 1924, Tifereth Israel purchased the Second Methodist Church and converted it into a synagogue. This marked the first, formal building to be dedicated to a synagogue in Kinston. This building served the congregation through World War II, until its present structure was built in 1950. A modern, brick structure with a sanctuary capable of seating more than 200 for the High Holy Days, and a half-dozen religious school classrooms, which was made possible through generous donations of the Brody, Stadiem, Cohen, Schechter, Fuchs, and Heilig families.

During the 1950s, Rabbi Jerome Tolochko was hired by the synagogue and he moved the synagogue away from its traditional, Orthodox-style worship to a more Reform Judaism style of worship. Mixed seating, a mixed-voice choir, and an organ were introduced.  Furthermore, the congregation officially changed its name to "Temple Israel".

With the decline of industry and commerce to Kinston in the late 1970s and early 1980s, the Jewish community also declined. Most Jewish families began to leave, and Temple Israel’s membership plummeted from 180 families in 1952 to only 40 families in 1982. By the 1990s, Temple Israel could no longer afford to support a full-time rabbi and has thus been without a rabbi for more than a decade.

The synagogue also owned a Jewish cemetery, which is currently maintained by the city of Kinston.

Today
Today, a mere twenty Jewish families reside in Kinston, who still meet once a month for Shabbat services and for the High Holy Days.

Notable members
Sol and Pearl Schechter
The Fuchs family
Bertram "Bert" Pearson, founder Bert's Surf Shop
Leo Brody, Jake Brody, Sam Brody, and Julius Samuel “Sammy” Brody, founder of Brody Brothers Dry Goods Company department store chain
W.A. Heilig, founder of Heilig-Meyers retail furniture store chain
Hyman Stadiem, founder H. Stadiem Inc. department store chain

References

Sources
"Kinston, North Carolina" in Encyclopedia of Southern Jewish Communities of the Goldring / Woldenberg Institute of Southern Jewish Life (accessed October 30, 2011).

External links
Synagogue website

Jewish organizations established in 1903
Synagogues completed in 1950
Reform synagogues in North Carolina
Buildings and structures in Lenoir County, North Carolina
1903 establishments in North Carolina